In From the Night (2006) is a Hallmark Hall of Fame film that premiered on CBS.

Plot summary
A boy named Bobby arrives unexpectedly at his aunt Vicky's house. Vicky can tell by his eyes that he was abused. Bobby came to Vicky because the happiest memories of his childhood were with her. Vicky gives up her job as a big writer temporarily to help Bobby.

Cast
 Marcia Gay Harden - Vicky Miller
 Taylor Handley - Bobby
 Thomas Gibson - Aiden Byrnes
 Kate Nelligan - Vera Miller
 Regina Taylor - Dr. A. Gardner
 MacKenzie Astin - Rob Miller
 Roxanne Hart - Ruth Miller Hammond
 Kevin Kilner - Chet Hammond
 Mageina Tovah - Priscilla Miller
 Nicholas Ballas - Abe Nolan
 Cody McMains - Tristan
 Miguel Perez - Ned Alvarez
 Lauren Tom - Dr. Myra Chen
 Ryan Donowho - Snakeman

Reception
Brian Lowry, of Variety said: "Sensitively directed by Peter Levin, the script by Susanna Styron and Bridget Terry -- who last collaborated on Hallmark's lyrical "Back When We Were Grownups"—is devoid of real surprises. Inevitably, Bobby's reclamation—and its impact on Vicki's neatly ordered world—will surely have its own rewards, culminating in the by-now-familiar notion that family is what you make of it." Rob Hedalt, of The Free Lance-Star, said "Two things make the latest Hallmark film special: the fact that the hero is played by the superb actress Marcia Gay Harden. And the fact that her character, in many ways, is just as flawed as the nephew she tries to save." The film was reviewed by Chicago Tribune.

Awards and nominations
In from the Night was nominated a Satellite Award for 'Best Motion Picture Made for Television' in 2006.

References

External links

2006 television films
2006 films
2006 drama films
Hallmark Hall of Fame episodes
Films directed by Peter Levin